Roy-Boissy is a commune in the Oise department in northern France.

See also
 Communes of the Oise department
 Lannoy Abbey

References

Communes of Oise
Oise communes articles needing translation from French Wikipedia